Maria Jane McIntosh (1803 in Sunbury, Georgia – 25 February 1878 in Morristown, New Jersey) was a writer. She began her literary career using the pseudonym "Aunt Kitty" and used contrasting pairs of characters to demonstrate her moral lesson.

Biography
Maria's father, Major Lachlan McIntosh fought in the American Revolutionary War, afterwards establishing a law practice in Sunbury, and starting a family.

Maria was educated in the Academy of Sunbury, and moved to New York City in 1835 to live with her brother, James M. McIntosh, after the death of both of her parents. Having lost her fortune in the Panic of 1837, she adopted authorship as a means of support.

Under the pen name of “Aunt Kitty” she published a juvenile story entitled “Blind Alice” that at once became popular (1841), and was followed by others (New York, 1843), the whole series being issued in one volume as Aunt Kitty's Tales (1847). On the recommendation of the tragedian Macready, these and many of her subsequent tales were reprinted in London.  Her writings are each illustrative of a moral sentiment.

Family
She was the sister of naval officer James McKay McIntosh.

Works
 Conquest and Self-Conquest (1844)
 Praise and Principle (1845)
 Two Lives, to Seem and to Be (1846)
 Aunt Kitty's Tales (1847)
 Charms and Counter Charms (1848)
 Woman in America: Her Work and Reward (1850)
 The Lofty and the Lowly (1852)
 Evenings at Donaldson Manor (1852)
 Emily Herbert (1855)
 Violet, or the Cross and Crown (1856)
 Meta Gray (1858)
 Two Pictures (1863)

Notes

References

External links

 
 
 

1803 births
1878 deaths
19th-century American novelists
American children's writers
American essayists
American women novelists
American women essayists
American women children's writers
19th-century American women writers
19th-century essayists